Offensive may refer to:

 Offensive, the former name of the Dutch political party Socialist Alternative
 Offensive (military), offensive
 Fighting words or insulting language, words that by their very utterance inflict injury or tend to incite an immediate breach of the peace
 Pejorative, or slur words 
 Profanity, strongly impolite, rude or offensive language

See also
 
 Offense (disambiguation)
 Offender (disambiguation)
 Charm offensive (disambiguation)